Amasonia is a genus of plants in the family Lamiaceae, native to South America and to the island of Trinidad.

They are shrubs, subshrubs, or perennial herbs. Leaves usually alternate, bracts are brightly colored (red, purple, or yellow), and the sepals are bright red or purple.

Species
Species include:
Amasonia angustifolia Mart. & Schauer - Brazil
Amasonia arborea Kunth - Trinidad, the Guianas, Brazil, Venezuela, Colombia, Bolivia
Amasonia calycina Hook.f. - Brazil, Guyana
Amasonia campestris (Aubl.) Moldenke - Trinidad, the Guianas, Brazil, Venezuela, Colombia
Amasonia hirta Benth. - Brazil, Paraguay
Amasonia obovata Gleason - Brazil, Cerro Duida in Venezuela

References

External links

 Kew Herbarium Fact Sheet on Amasonia

 
Lamiaceae genera
Flora of South America
Flora of Brazil
Flora of northern South America
Flora of Trinidad and Tobago